Ross Smith (born 21 February 1992, in Glasgow) is a Scottish footballer who plays as a defender for West of Scotland Football League club St Cadoc's. His previous clubs include Dundee United, Peterhead, Stenhousemuir, Stirling Albion and Kilwinning Rangers.

Club career
Smith was born in Glasgow and attended Boclair Academy in Bearsden, East Dunbartonshire. He joined Dundee United at under-14 level.

Having featured regularly and captained Dundee United's under-19 side during the 2009–10 season, Smith made his professional debut on 13 February 2010 as a substitute in a Scottish Premier League match against St Mirren. Despite being an unused substitute frequently during the 2010–11 season and being on the bench for their Europa League qualifier against Śląsk Wrocław, Smith failed to make a further first team appearance. On 10 February 2012, he joined Scottish Third Division side Peterhead on a month's loan deal. After the summer, his loan was extended for a further full season. On 9 August 2013, Smith joined Scottish League One side Stenhousemuir until the January transfer window, with an option to extend the deal until the end of the season.

In January 2014, Smith left Dundee United by mutual consent, returning to Peterhead and this time signing a permanent six-month contract. After eighteen months with Peterhead, Smith signed for recently relegated Stirling Albion in June 2015. Smith spent three years at Forthbank, before departing the club in May 2018.

After a spell with BSC Glasgow in the Lowland League, Smith signed a three-year contract with West of Scotland League Premier Division club Kilwinning Rangers in May 2021. After one season, and a season-ending injury, Smith dropped another division to sign for WoSFL First Division side St Cadoc's.

International career
Smith made his international debut for Scotland under-16s on 8 November 2007, as a substitute in a Victory Shield match against Northern Ireland. He won international caps at under-16 and under-17 level, where he captained the team six times. His last appearance for Scotland came at under-19 level, against Norway on 3 October 2010.

Career statistics

References

External links

1992 births
Living people
Footballers from Glasgow
Scottish footballers
Association football defenders
Scotland youth international footballers
Dundee United F.C. players
Peterhead F.C. players
Stenhousemuir F.C. players
Stirling Albion F.C. players
Scottish Premier League players
Scottish Football League players
Scottish Professional Football League players
People from Bearsden
Broomhill F.C. (Scotland) players
Lowland Football League players
Kilwinning Rangers F.C. players
West of Scotland Football League players